The Popular Liberal Action (ALP), simply called Liberal Action, was a political party that represented Catholic supporters of the French Third Republic.  It operated in the center-right, primarily to oppose the left-wing Republican coalition led by Pierre Waldeck-Rousseau and Émile Combes who pursued an anti-clerical agenda designed to weaken the Catholic Church, especially its role in education. The ALP between 1901 in 1914 had its best election in 1902, with 78 deputies. It built a nationwide newspaper and propaganda network, had excellent funding. There were 1200 local committees, with 200,000 dues paying members in 1906, giving at the strong space of any French political party.

History
The Liberal Action was founded in 1901 by Jacques Piou and Albert de Mun, former monarchists who switched to republicanism at the request of Pope Leo XIII. From the Churches perspective, its mission was to express the political ideals and new social doctrines embodied in Leo's 1891 encyclical "Rerum Novarum".

Action libérale was the parliamentary group from which the political party emerged, adding the word populaire ("popular") to signify this expansion.

Membership was open to everyone, not just Catholics. It sought to gather all the "honest people" and to be the melting pot sought by Leo XIII where Catholics and moderate Republicans would unite to support a policy of tolerance and social progress. Its motto summarized its program: "Liberty for all; equality before the law; better conditions for the workers." However, the "old republicans" were few, and it did not manage to regroup all Catholics, as it was shunned by monarchists, Christian democrats, and Integrists. In the end, it recruited mostly among the liberal-Catholics (Jacques Piou) and the Social Catholics (Albert de Mun).

The party was drawn into battle from its very beginnings (its first steps coincided with the beginning of the Combes ministry and its anticlerical combat policy), as religious matters were at the heart of its preoccupations. It defended the Church in the name of liberty and common law. Fiercely fought by the Action française, the movement declined from 1908, when it lost the support of Rome. Nevertheless, the ALP remained until 1914 the most important party on the right.

All but forgotten during World War I because of the Union sacrée, it re-emerged in 1919, with only its administrators, but still exerting an important moral influence on the Catholic electors. In 1919, the Action libérale populaire joined the Bloc national. After that, it sought to regroup, most notably in 1923 and 1927, but to no avail.

The Action libérale populaire played an important historical role by integrating into political life the Catholiques ralliés and by being the first political party, right of center, to organize itself under a "modern" scheme.

Notable members
 Jacques Piou, Founding president
 Albert de Mun, first vice-president
 Amiral de Cuverville, vice-president
 duc d'Estissac, vice-president
 Baron Xavier Reille
 Camille Guyot de Villeneuve
 Hyacinthe de Gailhard-Bancel
 Henri Bazire
 Henri-Constant Groussau
 Louis Hébert
 comte Ferri de Ludre
 Paul Lerolle
 marquis de l'Estourbeillon
 Jean Plichon
 Emmanuel de Las-Cases
 Léonce de Castelnau
 Xavier de la Rochefoucauld
 Émile Driant

Electoral results

Further reading
 Martin, Benjamin F. "The Creation of the Action Libérale Populaire: an Example of Party Formation in Third Republic France." French Historical Studies 9.4 (1976): 660-689. online
 Partin, Malcolm. Waldeck-Rousseau, Combes, and the Church: the Politics of Anticlericalism, 1899-1905 (1969)
 Phillips, Charles S. The church in France, 1848-1907 (1936).
 Sabatier, Paul. Disestablishment in France (1906) online

Defunct political parties in France
Political parties of the French Third Republic
Catholic political parties
Political parties established in 1901
Political parties disestablished in 1919
1901 establishments in France
1919 disestablishments in France